Ōtake, Otake, Ootake or Ohtake (written:  or ) is a Japanese surname. Notable people with the surname include:

, Japanese gravure idol
, Japanese Go player
, Japanese volleyball player
, Japanese voice actor
Jill Otake (born 1973), American judge
, Japanese baseball player
, Japanese comedian
, Japanese baseball player
, Japanese footballer
, Japanese women's footballer
, Japanese footballer and manager
, Japanese volleyball player
, Japanese martial artist
Ruy Ohtake (born 1938), Brazilian architect
, Japanese footballer
, Japanese actress
, Japanese artist
, Japanese photographer
, Japanese-Brazilian artist
, Japanese footballer
, Japanese volleyball player

Japanese-language surnames